Pleasant Lake is a spring fed lake located in Waterford Township, Michigan. It borders Elizabeth Lake Rd. to the north and is east of Williams Lake Rd.
The 95-acre lake is a private lake but does have a beach and boat ramp for the residents. At its deepest point, the lake is 52 feet deep.

Fish
Pleasant Lake contains a variety of fish, including Panfish, Bluegill, Carp, Northern Pike, Bullhead, Largemouth bass, bowfin, Smallmouth Bass, and Yellow Perch.

References

Lakes of Oakland County, Michigan
Lakes of Michigan
Lakes of Waterford Township, Michigan